Nelson Lam Chi-yuen,  (born 20 August 1968) is a Hong Kong accountant and politician who is Director of Audit. To take up the role, from 1 July 2022, he resigned as a Legislative Councillor in the Election Committee constituency (ECC) after less than six months in office. The ECC was then newly created under the electoral overhaul imposed by Beijing. 

On 5 January 2022, Carrie Lam announced new warnings and restrictions against social gathering due to potential COVID-19 outbreaks. One day later, it was discovered that Lam attended a birthday party hosted by Witman Hung Wai-man, with 222 guests. At least one guest tested positive with COVID-19, causing many guests to be quarantined.

Electoral history

References 

Living people
1968 births
HK LegCo Members 2022–2025
Members of the Election Committee of Hong Kong, 2021–2026
Hong Kong pro-Beijing politicians